Käbnitz is a stream in Königsbrück, Saxony, Germany. It is a tributary of the Pulsnitz.

See also
List of rivers of Saxony

Rivers of Saxony
Rivers of Germany